Antonis Makris (born July 1, 1981) is a Cypriot football forward who last played for Ermis Aradippou. He was considered a big talent while playing in AC Omonia. He also played in Greece with Larissa and Kerkyra

References

1981 births
Living people
Cypriot footballers
AC Omonia players
Doxa Katokopias FC players
Athlitiki Enosi Larissa F.C. players
A.O. Kerkyra players
Omonia Aradippou players
ASIL Lysi players
Ermis Aradippou FC players
Association football forwards
Cypriot expatriate footballers
Expatriate footballers in Greece
Cypriot expatriate sportspeople in Greece
Sportspeople from Nicosia